Taqdeer Ka Tamasha is a  1988 Hindi-language action film, produced and directed by Anand Gaekwad under the Film Group banner. It stars Jeetendra, Govinda, Aditya Pancholi, Moushumi Chatterjee, Kimi Katkar, Mandakini in the pivotal roles and music composed by Anand–Milind.

Plot
Satya Dev a truthful person builds a jaunty world with his pregnant wife Geeta and a son Surya Prakash and he always aids the people in trouble. Once, he catches a henchman of venomous gangster Sheshnaag and sentences him which begrudges Sheshnaag. During the labor, Geeta goes serious and a huge amount is required for her survival. Exploiting it, Sheshnaag clasps Satyadev into the vicious circle of the mafia. Eventually, he backstabs and sends him behind the bars. By that time, Geeta gives birth to another baby boy Satya and quits away from her husband's life. Soon after release, Satyadev vengeance against Sheshnaag and turns on his opponent.

Years roll by, and Satyadev summits in the netherworld but deified by destitution. Meanwhile, Geeta raises children with care. The elder one Surya Prakash is a daring cop whereas the younger Satya is a justice-seeking ruffian. Ongoing they find their love interests Rajni & Jhumri respectively. Here, Sheshnaag gazes at their strength and ploys by triggering them against Satyadev which makes father & sons rivals. Later, they realize the actuality, the family is reunited and Satyadev gives up his profession. Knowing it, Sheshnaag seizes Geeta, Rajni, & Jhumri when Satyadev declares war along with his sons and ceases him. At last, Satyadev & Geeta are severely injured in combat. Finally, the movie ends with the parents leaving their breath in the children's lap.

Cast

 Jeetendra as Satyadev
 Govinda as Satya
 Aditya Pancholi as Inspector Surya
 Moushumi Chatterjee as Geeta
 Kimi Katkar as Jhumri
 Mandakini as Rajni
 Sadashiv Amrapurkar as Sheshnaag
 Gulshan Grover as Gurughantal Dhaniya Pandey
 Satish Kaushik as Havaldar Sharma
 Suresh Chatwal as Bhandari

Soundtrack

References

External links

1990s Hindi-language films
1990 films
Films scored by Anand–Milind